Hans-Günter Etterich (born 16 August 1951) is a German former professional footballer who played as a midfielder.

Career statistics

References

External links 
 
 Günter Etterich at NASLjerseys.com

1951 births
Living people
Sportspeople from Bochum
German footballers
Footballers from North Rhine-Westphalia
Association football midfielders
Bundesliga players
2. Bundesliga players
North American Soccer League (1968–1984) players
VfL Bochum players
SC Westfalia Herne players
San Jose Earthquakes (1974–1988) players
Wuppertaler SV players
FSV Frankfurt players
SC Paderborn 07 players
German expatriate footballers
German expatriate sportspeople in the United States
Expatriate soccer players in the United States